Neoboutonia is a plant genus of the family Euphorbiaceae first described as a genus in 1864. It is the only genus in subtribe Neoboutoniinae, and native to tropical Africa. It is dioecious.

Species
 Neoboutonia macrocalyx  Pax - Burundi, Cameroon, Rwanda, Zaire, Kenya, Tanzania, Uganda, Malawi, Zambia, Zimbabwe 
 Neoboutonia mannii Benth. & Hook.f. - tropical Africa from Liberia to Mozambique
 Neoboutonia melleri (Müll.Arg.) Prain - tropical Africa from Nigeria to Mozambique

References

Aleuritideae
Euphorbiaceae genera
Flora of Africa
Dioecious plants